John Francis Treloar  (19 January 192823 July 2012) was a track and field athlete, who is considered to have been one of Australia's greatest male sprinters.  He was ranked as one of the world's fastest men between 1947 and 1952. A triple gold medallist at the 1950 British Empire Games, Treloar made the 100 m final at the 1952 Summer Olympics finishing sixth – just 0.1 s behind the winner – in the closest finish in Olympic history.

In his career, Treloar won a total of six Australian championships at 100 or 220 yards.

Treloar died on 23 July 2012. His son notified the Australian Olympic Committee of his father's death on 23 July; in this notification he stated that "Dad passed away exactly as he ran.  Quickly."

Awards and other honours 
In 2000, Treloar was awarded the Australian Sports Medal for "(o)utstanding service as an Olympic athlete and since then as an administrator and event organiser."

Treloar was appointed a Member of the Order of Australia (AM) in 2001.

In 2011, his old school, North Sydney Boys High School named their recently refurbished gymnasium in his honour.

Following Treloar's death, Prime Minister Julia Gillard and Minister for Sport Kate Lundy issued a joint press release which stated that Treloar "will always be remembered as a remarkable trailblazer for athletics in this country".

Treloar's funeral was later held at his old school, North Sydney Boys High School by request of his family.

Competition record

References

1928 births
2012 deaths
Australian male sprinters
Athletes (track and field) at the 1952 Summer Olympics
Olympic athletes of Australia
Sportsmen from New South Wales
People educated at North Sydney Boys High School
Commonwealth Games gold medallists for Australia
Commonwealth Games medallists in athletics
Athletes (track and field) at the 1950 British Empire Games
Members of the Order of Australia
Recipients of the Australian Sports Medal
Place of birth missing
Australian Freemasons
Athletes (track and field) at the 1948 Summer Olympics
Medallists at the 1950 British Empire Games